The North Brighton Cemetery, operated by the City of Holdfast Bay in Somerton Park had its first burial in 1859.

Interments
 William Fisk (1871–1940) politician
 Pat Glennon  (1927–2004) jockey
 Henry Hamilton (1826–1907) grape-grower and wine-maker and
 Frank Hamilton (1859–1913) wine-maker
 Reginald Pole Blundell (1871–1945) tobacco-twister, trade unionist and politician
 Arthur Donald McCutcheon (1890–1955) Methodist minister and social worker
 Mabel Mary McCutcheon (1886–1942) nurse
 Paul Moran
 Francis Phillip O'Grady (1900–1981) engineer and public servant
 Catherine Helen Spence
 J. B. Spence
 William George Torr (1853–1939) headmaster

References

1859 establishments in Australia
Cemeteries in South Australia